Striker (also known as Combat Force; released in the Philippines as Nicaragua) is an Italian action film directed by Enzo G. Castellari.  The film imitates the style of the Rambo movies.

Cast
John Phillip Law: Frank Morris
Melonee Rodgers: Marta
Frank Zagarino: Slade
John Steiner: Kariasin
Werner Pochath: Houtman
Daniel Greene: Truck Driver

Release
In the Philippines, the film was released as Nicaragua by Golden Films on March 17, 1988.

Reception
From contemporary reviews, "Lor." of Variety reviewed the AIP Home Video release on January 16, 1989, declaring the film to be an "above-average Italian actioner" that was "attractively lensed on location in Santo Domingo" with the battles, captures and escapes being "well-executed by Enzo G. Castellari".

References

Sources

External links

1988 films
1988 action films
Films directed by Enzo G. Castellari
Films set in Nicaragua
Italian action films
Macaroni Combat films
Cockfighting in film
1980s Italian films